Argançon is a commune in the Aube department in the Grand Est region of north-central France.

Geography
Argançon is located some 8 km east by north-east of Vendeuvre-sur-Barse and 8 km north-west of Bar-sur-Aube in the Orient Forest Regional Natural Park. Access to the commune is by highway D619 from Dolancourt in the north-east through the north of the commune to Magny-Fouchard in the west. Access to the village is by the D44 from Dolancourt passing through the village and continuing south to Spoy. There is also the D144 road from the village to the hamlet of Le Chanet in the north of the commune. Two thirds of the commune is farmland with the rest heavily forested in the east and the south.

The Landion river flows through the commune from south to north passing through the village and continuing north to join the Aube just north of Dolancourt.

Neighbouring communes and villages

Administration

List of Successive Mayors

Population

Sites and monuments

The Church of Saint-Pierre-ès-Liens has a Romanesque nave and a sanctuary rebuilt in the 16th century. It contains many items that are registered as historical objects:

The Tombstone of Jean de la Salle (1649)
The Tombstone of Charles le Roux (1681)
A Tombstone (disappeared) (1655)
A Bust (16th century)
A Monstrance with box (19th century)
2 Ciboriums (19th century)
Chalices and Patens (19th century)
A Processional Staff: Saint Nicolas (19th century)
A Processional Staff: Saint Peter (18th century)
A Processional Staff: Saint Éloi (19th century)
An Altar and Retable of Saint Nicolas (18th century)
A Bronze Bell (1779)
The Furniture in the Church

See also
Communes of the Aube department
Orient Forest Regional Natural Park

External links
Argançon on the National Geographic Institute website 
Argançon on Géoportail, National Geographic Institute (IGN) website 
Argançon on the 1750 Cassini Map

References

Communes of Aube